Red Hair is a 1928 silent film starring Clara Bow and Lane Chandler, directed by Clarence G. Badger, based on a 1905 novel by Elinor Glyn, and released by Paramount Pictures.

The film had one sequence filmed in Technicolor, and is now considered a lost film except for the color sequence at the UCLA Film and Television Archive, and a few production stills.

Plot
A free-spirited young girl has three middle-aged admirers, each of whom sees her from a completely different perspective. Unknown to her, they also happen to be the guardians of a wealthy young man to whom she is attracted.

Cast
Clara Bow as Bubbles McCoy
Lane Chandler as Robert Lennon
William Austin as Dr. Eustace Gill
Jacqueline Gadsden as Minnie Luther
Lawrence Grant as Judge Rufus Lennon
Claude King as Thomas L. Burke
William Irving as Demmy

See also
List of lost films
List of early color feature films

References

External links

Red Hair at SilentEra.com
Red Hair at Virtual History

1920s color films
1928 lost films
American silent feature films
Paramount Pictures films
Lost American films
Films directed by Clarence G. Badger
Films based on British novels
American black-and-white films
Silent films in color
1928 comedy films
Silent American comedy films
Films produced by B. P. Schulberg
Lost comedy films
1920s American films